Binkowice  is a village in the administrative district of Gmina Ożarów, within Opatów County, Świętokrzyskie Voivodeship, in south-central Poland.

The village has a population of 90.

In the early 17th century the village of Binkowice was owned by nobleman Michał Piekarski, who in 1620 attempted to assassinate king Sigismund III.

References

Binkowice